Chess King was an American men's clothing retailer 1968–1995.

Chess King or King of Chess may also refer to:

King (chess), the most important piece in the game of chess
The Chess Master (Chinese: 棋王, 'King of Chess'), a 1984 novel by Ah Cheng
Chess King (film), a 1988 film based on the novel